DENIS@home is a volunteer computing project hosted by Universidad San Jorge (Zaragoza,Spain) and running on the Berkeley Open Infrastructure for Network Computing (BOINC) software platform.

The primary goal of DENIS@home is to compute large amounts of cardiac electrophysiological simulations.

Development 
DENIS@home was initially released on March 20, 2015. Since then, it has been developed by a team of three people aided by four undergraduate students. All members of the development team are a part of the Biomedical Signal Interpretation and Computational Simulation research group.

See also 
List of volunteer computing projects

References

External links 
 
 

 Science in society
Volunteer computing projects